Chipewyan 201 is an Indian reserve of the Athabasca Chipewyan First Nation in Alberta, located within the Regional Municipality of Wood Buffalo on the south shore of Lake Athabasca.

References

Indian reserves in Alberta
Lake Athabasca